The Alpina B7 (F01) is the fourth generation of the high-performance BMW 7 Series manufactured by Alpina from 2011 until 2015. Based on the BMW 7 Series (F01), the car was introduced to the public at the 2010 Chicago Auto Show and was available in normal and long-wheelbase versions, with xDrive or rear-wheel drive. The B7's engine was hand-built at the Alpina factory at Buchloe and then sent to the BMW factory in Dingolfing to be put into the body shell. The car was painted and initially assembled at the Dingolfing plant and was then sent back to Alpina for final assembly. It was the second Alpina B7 to be offered in North America, with 1,740 examples imported and sold in the United States.

Specifications 

The B7 is based on the BMW 750i and the 750Li and uses a modified version of its 4.4-litre N63 twin-turbocharged V8 engine. The modifications include large  Honeywell turbochargers, reinforced cylinder heads, NGK spark plugs, high strength MAHLE pistons and an Alpina specific ECU. The maximum torque is generated at 3,000 rpm, 1,250 rpm less than the previous model. To cope with the extra heat from the engine, an additional radiator, external engine and transmission oil-coolers, a high performance 1,000 watt fan (shared with the 760i) and larger intercoolers with large diameter water lines were installed.

The engine was mated to a modified version of the 6-speed ZF 6HP26 TUe automatic transmission used in the 750i. Modifications to the transmission include reinforced drive-shafts and half-shafts along with a stiffer iron differential case. The transmission has a manual shifting mode which allows the driver to change gears via two buttons behind the steering wheel. The car was available in rear-wheel-drive and all-wheel-drive drivetrains.

The brakes were shared with the high security 760Li and were the largest brakes fitted to an Alpina automobile.

The B7 was available with 21-inch Alpina multi-spoke alloy wheels wrapped in tyres measuring 245/35 at the front and 285/30 at the rear. Only the rear-wheel-drive models were available with Michelin Pilot Sport PS2 tyres. Other exterior changes include unique exhaust tips, an integrated front spoiler in the front bumper along with additional brake cooling ducts, a rear valance and a rear lip spoiler. The rear spoiler was claimed to reduce lift by 15 percent while the front spoiler was claimed to reduce lift by 30 percent.

The interior of the car had illuminated sill plaques, Lavalina leather upholstery, piano black or burle myrtle wood trim and Alpina logos and badges along with an Alpina instrument cluster. The driving modes were the same as in the 750i.

Face-lift 

From 2012 to the end of its production run, the B7 was based on the face-lift 750i. The updated model was introduced at the 2012 Pebble Beach Concours D'Elegance. The 8-speed automatic transmission introduced on the face-lift 7 Series also became available on the B7.

Other modifications remained the same as the outgoing model.

References

External links 

B7 (F01)
Cars introduced in 2010
Cars introduced in 2012
Rear-wheel-drive vehicles
All-wheel-drive vehicles
Limousines
Sedans